Telocaset  is an unincorporated community in Union County, Oregon, United States. It was a stagecoach station whose name comes from the Nez Perce word meaning "a thing at the top" or "put on top". The Nez Perce pronounced the word taule-karset.

Beginning in 1885, it was a station on the Oregon Railway and Navigation Company line; today the line is owned by Union Pacific. Telocaset was never platted, but it had a post office that ran from 1885 until 1975.

References

Unincorporated communities in Union County, Oregon
1885 establishments in Oregon
Populated places established in 1885
Unincorporated communities in Oregon
Oregon placenames of Native American origin